Benny Ray Hester (born May 3, 1948) is an American musician, singer, songwriter and recording artist. He is perhaps best known for his songs "When God Ran" and "Nobody Knows Me Like You", and for producing the groundbreaking tween/teen music-driven sketch comedy and dance television series Roundhouse on Nickelodeon. Hester received a television Cable Ace Award for the song "I Can Dream" and a collection of nominations for writing and producing a featured original song for each weekly episode of Roundhouse during its successful four-year run. He has written and recorded more than 25 number one and top ten songs.

Hester's recording of his song "When God Ran" touched the consciousness of Christians worldwide, and is one of the longest running number one songs in Contemporary Christian Music history, number one for 13 weeks, and the number three song in the 60-year history of Word Records. “When God Ran” continues to be rerecorded by artists in many languages and musical genres, including adult contemporary, pop, rock, R&B, alternative, and Southern Gospel, making it to the top of the charts repeatedly.

The title track from his third album, "Nobody Knows Me Like You", reached number one on Christian Music Charts and became the first Contemporary Christian music song to break the Billboard Top 50 Adult Contemporary Chart, debuting at number 44 on November 7, 1981.

Hester's first Contemporary Christian music singles, "Jesus Came Into My Life" and "Be A Receiver", were breakthrough recordings for radio, blurring the lines between pop, rock, and inspirational music, and becoming the first contemporary pop rock songs to be universally accepted and widely played across all Christian Radio formats. His 1978 self-titled debut album Benny Hester, re-released in 1982 as Be A Receiver, influenced the burgeoning Contemporary Christian music scene, and ranks among the first "Contemporary Christian Music" albums as the musical landscape shifted with the end of the Jesus Music era and the birth of the industry known as Contemporary Christian music.

Early life and influences 

Benny Hester was born in Waco, Texas, and began studying classical music at age four. He continued his studies through high school with European teachers and musical innovators John and Martha Reuther. Hester was among the first to master John Reuther's futuristic chromatic “checkerboard” designed keyboard and one of a handful of musicians to become expert on the instrument, playing public performances to demonstrate its attributes over the standard keyboard.

Hester auditioned and was chosen to sing with The Texas Boys Choir.

He became the youngest member of the Texas swing band, Sam Weaver and The Texas Playboys, and appeared on the band's weekly television show playing alongside guest music legends including Johnny Gimble and Ernest Tubb.

While attending Richfield High School, Hester was one of the founding members of the popular Texas pop rock band, The Morticians. He wrote songs for the group and included them in sets for the band's sizable revved up audiences. Headed now by guitarist and original founding member, Joe Hall, The Morticians continue to play concerts regularly.

Hester was hired to play in the live stage band and orchestra for the long running musical, Texas, and continued with the show for two years. While performing in Texas, he founded the singing duo, Hester & Hilton, with partner Steve Hilton. Hester & Hilton performed their own songs along with stylized takes on songs by their favorite artists. While playing El Paso, Hester was asked to write two songs for a recording session by the group, The Sojourners. It turned out to be his first professional recording session as a songwriter. The two songs were produced and engineered by Norman Petty and recorded at Norman Petty Studios in Clovis, New Mexico, where Hester had the opportunity to work with the legendary Petty and record in his hit studio. Hester and his older brother, a music fan with a ten-year head start on him, grew up singing and listening to Buddy Holly songs. Norman Petty produced and recorded those songs. Hester coincidentally attended Texas Tech in Lubbock, Texas, home to Petty and birthplace of Holly.

Career

1969: Maher, MusAd, and the Runnin' Rebels of UNLV 

Hester moved to Las Vegas, Nevada where, on a walk-through of Bill Porter's United Recording Studio, he met head recording engineer Brent Maher. When Maher questioned him, “What do you do?”, Hester answered back, “I’m a songwriter”. Maher invited Hester to play a song. After hearing it, Maher asked, “Do you have another one of those?” Hester and Maher spent the remainder of the day with Hester playing one tune after another from a notebook collection, of what Hester felt were his best songs, entitled “The Good Book”, as well as from his second, ongoing, collection, “The Better Book”. They became immediate friends and remain so today. During that period Maher was engineering Ike and Tina Turner’s “Proud Mary", The 5th Dimension's Age of Aquarius, Duke Ellington's last record, The Jackson 5, Chuck Berry, Sammy Davis Jr., Gladys Knight, Sly and the Family Stone, and others, and Maher brought Hester to many of those memorable recording sessions. These first hand and close up studio experiences had a lasting effect on Hester and his music, further inspiring his songwriting, and giving him an invaluable understanding of how artists choose their songs and record their music.

Hester taught music at a private music school, recorded Hester & Hilton demos with Maher at United Recording, and later, with Maher, formed a successful jingle advertising company, MusAd, which dominated the Las Vegas radio and television market for ten years. He penned the song for Hickory Farms Of Ohio, and Nevada’s largest newspaper, The Las Vegas Review Journal, with the slogan “The RJ is Las Vegas” appearing on billboards and ads still. Together Hester and Maher wrote and produced commercial songs for many Las Vegas hotels and banks, Nevada's largest home builders, trendy clothing manufacturers and outlets, and notably, at the request of famed coach Jerry Tarkanian, the original University Of Nevada Las Vegas fight song and school song for the UNLV Runnin’ Rebels basketball team.

1972: Album with Elvis Presley's band 

Maher went on to produce Hester's first two albums, the self-titled Benny..., on Bill Porter's VMI Records/Vegas Music International, and his first CCM album for Billy Ray Hearn's Sparrow Records. Hester first became a Christian while attending an evangelical rally at a traveling tent crusade called Christ is the Answer. He later attended a local church called The Neighborhood Church. Hester's unexpected spiritual awakening resulted in his prophetic "second coming" song, and first VMI single, "We All Know He's Coming", recorded with Elvis Presley’s TCB Band.

Hester learned from sitting behind the console and watching recording and sound engineer, and VMI Records president, Bill Porter, mix the live concerts each night for Elvis Presley, in the main showroom of the International Hotel, later the Las Vegas Hilton. Hester was taken, not only with Elvis’s performances, but with Elvis’s band, which included drummer, Ron Tutt, who had recently played drums on the recording of Cat Stevens’, “Peace Train”. Maher and Porter brought Elvis's band, the TCB Band, to record with Hester for his first album. The band was made up of Ron Tutt, James Burton, Glen Hardin and Jerry Scheff, as well as Larry Muhoberac and Joe Osborn.

The finished masters and packaged albums, ready for record company distribution, were lost in the studio and warehouse fire that destroyed United Recording. Hester's first album was never released. Only a few albums survived the fire, ending up in the hands of collectors.

A digitally remastered version was released on February 19, 2016, made from the artists own promotional copy of the original vinyl. A track from the album, "No the End is Not Near" was featured in the season opener of the fifth season of the HBO show Girls.

Singles and albums: '70s, '80s, '90s 

Hester recovered from the fire that claimed his first major recording project. In 1975, Monument Records released  "Good Night, Good Day" and "Country Boy". Decca Records followed with the release of "Jamaica Way" and "Melody Man", in 1978. Decca later released a 1980 compilation album featuring Hester as the only new emerging artist on the record, and the first song on side B, with an eclectic group of established artists, Jimmy Buffett, Tex Williams, Ray Stevens, and others. While labels continued to explore music genres, with the release of his 1978 CCM debut album on Sparrow Records, which he recorded with his Las Vegas formed live concert band, Hester was able to emerge with an album that showcased his instantly recognizable pop rock vocals and songwriting style, and his, by now, finely tuned, spiritually driven themes. This period proved to be defining, and helped set the course for his music and future.

Hester has since released a string of hit albums and chart topping songs, and performed thousands of concerts. His recording of his song “When God Ran” is the longest running number one song in Contemporary Christian Music history, spending 13 weeks at number one on Christian Radio and topping both the AC and CHR Charts. When another single from the same album, "Secret Thoughts", made it to number one on the Rock Charts, Hester had three simultaneous chart toppers, a feat which had never been achieved up to that point in Christian music. “When God Ran” was the number one most played Christian Adult Contemporary radio hit of 1986, and number three for the entire decade. “When God Ran” continues to be rerecorded by artists in many languages and musical genres, including Adult Contemporary, Pop, Rock, Alternative Rock, and Southern Gospel, making it to the top of the charts repeatedly. A version recorded by The Kingsmen took the number one spot on the Southern Gospel Charts in February 2009 and was nominated Gospel Music Song Of The Year and Album Of The Year.

Other top Benny Hester songs include "Nobody Knows Me Like You", "Christ The Solid Rock", "Rubber Canoe", "Come Back", "Goodbye Salty", "Legacy", "Whoever Touches You", "Streets Of Las Vegas", "Can I Get To You From Here", "No Man's Land", "Step By Step", "To Fill Our Empty Hearts", "Real Change", "Melody Man", "Hold Me", "Jesus Came Into My Life", "Be A Receiver", "Sure Of Your Call", "The Door", "Squeeze You", "We All Know He's Comin'", "Out Of The Natural", "Underground River", "Remember Me", "Caught Away", "You Weren't Meant To Live Your Life Alone".

Television and radio 

From 1992 to 1996 Hester was Co-Executive Producer, Music Producer/Musical Director and Songwriter for the award-winning Nickelodeon/MTV Networks television series Roundhouse. He was nominated for seven songwriting and music producer awards, winning for “I Can Dream” (Cable Ace Award) and “Can’t Let Go” (Hollywood Foreign Press Youth In Film Award) in the best Original Song for television categories. He also received three television Cable Ace Award nominations for best Variety Special or Series as Co-Executive Producer of Roundhouse. 

The twelve member triple-threat cast of Roundhouse received Outstanding Ensemble Cast in a Youth Series or Variety Show as awarded by the Hollywood Foreign Press Youth In Film Awards.

Hester is the recipient of the prestigious Ollie Award for Excellence in Television Programming for America’s Children, presented by the American Center for Children's Television.

Benny Hester and record producer Howard Benson prepared the first Roundhouse Cast album for release on Irving Azoff's Giant Records (Warner Music Group). The Irving Azoff/Giant Records album masters contained six Roundhouse Cable Ace nominated tunes, including the Hester/Sheffield penned Cable Ace winner "I Can Dream". Nickelodeon exercised its 50% approval right by blocking the first of four Roundhouse cast albums, which included five solo artist spinoff options. Simultaneously, Nickelodeon withheld approval of the use of the cable channels name in association with the 30 city Roundhouse concert tour by Pace Entertainment Corporation's Pace Theatrical, a subsidiary of Live Nation Entertainment. The Disney Channel, under the leadership of former Nickelodeon employees, recognized the missed opportunity and jumped ahead of Nickelodeon in music driven television for the tween/teen market, eventually surpassing them in viewer ratings.

After a pitch to the Disney Channel by Roundhouse producers in 2001 of the show Rock and Roland, in which a junior high boy was a "normal kid by day, rock star by night” (gender option given during the pitch), and after providing additional written scenes and a plan for marketing the music from the show through Disney's Hollywood Records, the Disney Channel’s Rich Ross publicly took credit for the success of Disney’s gender-reversed multibillion-dollar franchise Hannah Montana, as did the channel's Adam Bonnett. Ross and Bonnett were both former Nickelodeon executives who worked with, among others, the award-winning Roundhouse and its newly acquired age 9 to 17 demographic, airing in Nickelodeon’s first prime time block, SNICK. SNICK was later revamped as TEENick to target the newly found tween/teen audience. Ross was Nickelodeon Talent Booker turned VP Of Program Enterprises, involved in all Nickelodeon original programming deals and, Bonnett, Production Coordinator becoming Director Of Current Programming for Nickelodeon.

Ross and Bonnett were subsequently promoted at Disney, along with others from the Disney Channel, and credited for Hannah Montana’s broad reaching success across TV, music, and live tours, the model first proposed and put into motion by Roundhouse producers at Nickelodeon, but blocked by the network during the time Ross and Bonnett were there. That decision turned out to be shortsighted by Nickelodeon, and when proposed again to the then underutilized Disney Channel as a tie-in to the underperforming Hollywood Records (Disney Music Group), the concept proved inherently valuable enough that, as the complaint filed against Disney in 2007 in Los Angeles claimed, Rock and Roland was misappropriated by Disney and produced under the name Hannah Montana. For their key roles in bringing Hannah Montana to Disney, Rich Ross was elevated from the Disney Channel to Chairman of Walt Disney Studios in October 2009, forced to resign April 2012, and Adam Bonnett upped to Senior Vice President, Original Programming, Disney Channel.

The Walt Disney Company and Disney ABC Cable Networks Group agreed to settle the legal claim regarding Hannah Montana and Rock and Roland less than four weeks before the jury trial was to begin in Los Angeles Superior Court on August 26, 2008.

Discography

Awards 

 2013 Lifetime Achievement Award in Contemporary Christian Music - Pepperdine University, Malibu, California, Malibu Music Awards
 CableACE Award for best Original Song - "I Can Dream" - Roundhouse - Viacom Media Networks
 Six television CableACE Award nominations for best Original Song - Roundhouse - Viacom Media Networks
 Three television CableACE Award nominations for best Variety Special or Series, Co-Executive Producer - Roundhouse - Viacom Media Networks
 Ollie Award - Prestigious recognition for Excellence in Television Programming for America's Children - American Center for Children's Television
 Hollywood Foreign Press Youth In Film Award for Best Original Song - "Can't Let Go" - Roundhouse - Viacom Media Networks
 Hollywood Foreign Press Youth In Film Award for Outstanding Ensemble Cast in a Youth Series or Variety Show, Co-Executive Producer - Roundhouse - Viacom Media Networks
 Grammy nomination - Nobody Knows Me Like You - Word / Warner
 Dove Award nomination - "When God Ran" - Word / Warner

References

External links 

 

Living people
American performers of Christian music
American male singers
Myrrh Records artists
1948 births